The Daegu Samsung Lions Park is a multi-use stadium in Daegu, South Korea. It is used mostly for baseball games and is the home stadium of KBO club Samsung Lions.

The stadium is located adjacent to Daegu Grand Park station on the Daegu Metro Line 2

References

2016 establishments in South Korea
Baseball venues in South Korea
Multi-purpose stadiums in South Korea
Samsung Lions
Sports venues completed in 2016
Sports venues in Daegu